Sarpong is an Ashanti surname. It means supreme. The first part of the name SA is of Arabic root and means supreme. While the second part, 'Pong', is Akan and also means supreme. The first syllable 'SA' is also an Akan word meaning 'War'. 'Pɔn' means great or supreme. So Sarpong or Sapɔn means 'Great Warrior' or supreme warrior. On the other hand, the name also refers to a person born during a great war. Notable people with surname include:

Nana Akuoko Sarpong, Ɔmanhene of Agogo, Asante Akyem.
Michael Sarpong (born 1996), Ghanaian footballer
 Jeffrey Sarpong (born 1988), Ghanaian-Dutch professional footballer
 June Sarpong (born 1977), English television presenter
 Kweku Sarpong Plahar better known as Zigi (born 1988), Ghanaian singer
 Richmond Sarpong (born 1974), Ghanaian-American chemist 
 Sam Sarpong (1979-2015), English-American actor and model
 Yaw Sarpong, Ghanaian gospel musician
 Emmanuel Oppong-Sarpong (born 1977), mechanical engineer / programmer

Surnames of Ashanti origin
Surnames of Akan origin